Matteo Abbate (born 21 August 1983) is a former Italian footballer defender.

Career
He started his career at Piacenza.

In 2010 Abbate joined Hellas Verona F.C. in 2-year contract. The contract later extended.

In January 2013 he was signed by Pro Vercelli. On 13 August 2013 Abbate joined Cremonese.

On 11 August 2016 Abbate re-joined Piacenza.

References

External links
 aic.football.it
 

Italian footballers
Piacenza Calcio 1919 players
A.C. Ancona players
A.S.D. Gallipoli Football 1909 players
Hellas Verona F.C. players
F.C. Pro Vercelli 1892 players
U.S. Cremonese players
F.C. Pavia players
Serie A players
Serie B players
Serie C players
Association football defenders
People from Orbetello
1983 births
Living people
Sportspeople from the Province of Grosseto
Footballers from Tuscany